Andrew Spence may refer to:

 Andrew Spence (musician) (born 1983), South African drummer
 Andrew Spence (artist) (born 1947), American painter 
 Andrew Michael Spence (born 1943), Canadian-American economist